Space Yamato is a group of Japanese anime television series, including:

 Space Battleship Yamato
 Space Battleship Yamato II
 Space Battleship Yamato III
 Space Battleship Yamato 2199